Thomas James "T. J." Cloutier (born October 13, 1939) is a professional poker player from Richardson, Texas. He was inducted into the Poker Hall of Fame in 2006.

Early years
Cloutier was born in Albany, California, and attended the University of California, Berkeley on an athletic scholarship for football and baseball and played in the 1959 Rose Bowl. He later dropped out of college because of family financial hardship.

Cloutier was drafted into the United States Army. After the Army, he played football in the Canadian Football League for the Toronto Argonauts and Montreal Alouettes, but an injury cut his career short.

After his football career ended, Cloutier started a food company, but it was not successful, so following the end of his first marriage, he moved to Texas to work on oil rigs. On his off days, he began to play poker, and quit his job after realizing that he was winning more money playing poker than working. He started playing poker when he was a caddy at a golf course and played poker after the rounds.

In addition to poker, Cloutier is well known for his high-stakes craps sessions.

Poker career

World Series of Poker
Cloutier specializes in playing tournament poker, especially no-limit and pot limit hold'em. He is the only person in the history of the World Series of Poker (WSOP) to have won events in three types of Omaha played at the World Series — Pot Limit High, Limit High, and Limit 8-or-Better High-low split. Cloutier has won a total of six WSOP bracelets in his career, in addition to many other titles in various kinds of poker games.

He has placed four times in the top five in the Main Event of the World Series of Poker, including two second-place finishes, in 1985, losing to Bill Smith, and 2000, losing to Chris Ferguson. Cloutier also finished in fifth place in 1988, won by Johnny Chan, and in third place in 1998, won by Scotty Nguyen.

In 2009, Cloutier was one of numerous players turned away from the Main Event, as registration was capped on that particular day. He did admit it was own fault for not signing up earlier and not looking for special treatment.

WSOP bracelets

In January 2010, The Plano Pawn Shop auctioned off Cloutier's 2005 bracelet on eBay for $4,006.

World Poker Tour
Cloutier also plays in World Poker Tour (WPT) events, where his highest finish is third in the 2003 Legends of Poker event, won by fellow professional Mel Judah. He has also been featured in the Ultimate Poker Challenge, the National Heads-Up Poker Championship, Poker Superstars Invitational Tournament and Poker Royale: Battle of the Ages.

As of 2017, his total live tournament winnings exceed $10,350,000, of which over $4,675,000 has come at the WSOP.

Poker writings
Cloutier is the co-author (with Tom McEvoy) of four books on poker:
 Championship Tournament Practice Hands
 Championship Holdem
 Championship Omaha
 Championship No-Limit and Pot Limit Hold'em.

He has also written How To Win The Championship: Hold'em Strategies For The Final Table, a book covering tournament strategy with an emphasis on the final few tables.

Cloutier formerly wrote for Card Player magazine.

Media
 He features in the computer game World Class Poker with T.J. Cloutier.
 He appears in the "Prince of Poker" episode of the History Channel series Breaking Vegas.

References

1939 births
American poker players
American gambling writers
American male non-fiction writers
California Golden Bears football players
Toronto Argonauts players
Montreal Alouettes players
World Series of Poker bracelet winners
Super Bowl of Poker event winners
Living people
People from Albany, California
People from Richardson, Texas
United States Army soldiers
Poker Hall of Fame inductees
California Golden Bears baseball players
Sportspeople from Alameda County, California
Baseball players from California
Players of American football from California